Franceschetti–Klein syndrome (also known as "mandibulofacial dysostosis") is a syndrome that includes palpebral antimongoloid fissures, hypoplasia of the facial bones, macrostomia, vaulted palate, malformations of both the external and internal ear, buccal-auricular fistula, abnormal development of the neck with stretching of the cheeks, accessory facial fissures, and skeletal deformities.It is sometimes equated with Treacher Collins syndrome.

See also
 Dysostosis

References

External links 

Genodermatoses
Congenital disorders of musculoskeletal system
Rare syndromes